The Uruguayan ambassador in East Berlin was the official representative of the Government in Montevideo to the Government of East Germany.

History 
 Since 1972 the Embassy of Uruguay was in the Grimmnitzstraße 15 Karlshorst.
 Since 1975 the Embassy of Uruguay is in the street Clara Zetkin-Str. 89 (today Dorotheenstraße):
 1st floor: 
 2nd floor: 
 3th floor: North Yemen Embassy
 4th floor:  and Lebanon
 5th floor: Uruguay, 

List of representatives

References 

 
Germany East
Uruguay